A Peculiar Treasure is an autobiography by American author Edna Ferber. The book was first published in 1938 by Doubleday, Doran, & Co. at 398 pages long. The book is Ferber's first autobiography, and recounts her small-town, Midwest childhood, and her subsequent rise to authorship and the Pulitzer Prize. Her ascent from night-court reporter at a small-town newspaper to the author of So Big is set against the rising tensions in Europe and upsurging anti-semitism in the US.

References

1938 non-fiction books
American autobiographies